The men's 400 metre freestyle S8 event at the 2016 Paralympic Games took place on 8 September, at the Olympic Aquatics Stadium.

Two heats were held, both with six swimmers. The swimmers with the eight fastest times advanced to the final.

Records
, the existing World and Paralympic records were as follows.

Heats

Heat 1

Heat 2

Final

References

Swimming at the 2016 Summer Paralympics